Makihara (written: 槇原 or 槙原) is a Japanese surname. Notable people with the surname include:

, Japanese baseball player
, Japanese business executive
, Japanese singer-songwriter

Japanese-language surnames